André Puccinelli (born 2 July 1948) is an Italian-Brazilian physician and politician, affiliated with the Brazilian Democratic Movement (MDB). He was the first foreigner to be mayor of Campo Grande in Brazilian history. He was secretary of health for the State of Mato Grosso do Sul, state deputy, federal deputy, mayor of Campo Grande for two terms and elected and re-elected governor of Mato Grosso do Sul. André Puccinelli was born in Italy and moved to Brazil still a child.

See also
 List of mayors of Campo Grande (Mato Grosso do Sul)

References

1948 births
Brazilian people of Italian descent
Italian emigrants to Brazil
Governors of Mato Grosso do Sul
Living people
People from Viareggio
Federal University of Paraná alumni